Sensui Shoji (10 November 1903 – 7 September 1991) was a Japanese bibliophile and author. He wrote and translated over 100 books and articles, mainly on the history of Japanese and Western literature, but also in the area of the supernatural.

Selected publications

Bibliographic
 書籍装釘の歴史と実際（1929）
 書物の話（1931）
 書物のはなし 語りべから現代の書物まで（1956）
 本の文化史 ブック・アラカルト（1963）
 紙魚のたわごと（1966）
 本の世界（1970）
 愛書六十五年 一書物人のメモの中から（1983）
 書物よもやま話（1986）
 定本庄司浅水著作集 書誌編（14 volumes, 1979-1983）

Other
 世界の奇談(1958)
 海の奇談(1961)
 世界の秘話(1962)
 世界の怪談(1964)
 世界の秘境(1965)
 世界の魔の海(1965)
 世界の驚異をたずねて(1965)
 世界の怪奇ミステリー(1973)
 世界の怪奇(1975)
 庄司浅水ノンフィクション著作集(12 volumes, 1987-1988)

References 

1903 births
1991 deaths
Japanese collectors
Japanese non-fiction writers
Japanese translators
Japanese magazine editors
Bibliographers